Mehr Ali Farsi castle is a historical castle located in Eqlid County in Fars Province, The longevity of this fortress dates back to the Prehistoric times of ancient Iran.

References 

Castles in Iran